The Aarau–Schöftland railway may refer to:

The Aarau–Schöftland railway line, a narrow-gauge railway line in Switzerland
The Aarau-Schöftland Bahn, the former railway company that originally built the Aarau–Schöftland railway line